Pursuant to Article 57 of the Law on Internal Regulations of the Islamic Consultative Assembly (Parliament of the Islamic Republic of Iran), the Judiciary and Legal Commission of the Islamic Consultative Assembly is formed to perform its assigned duties within the judicial and legal framework in accordance with the provisions of the regulation.

Some of the responsibilities of this commission are:

 Judicial and legal review of the proposed minister's plans in the parliament
 Investigating judicial and legal problems at the community level
 Review and approval of plans and bills related to the laws of the country in various fields
 Review and approval of plans and bills related to criminal law and criminology
 Review and approval of plans and bills related to crime prevention
 Review and approval of plans and bills related to the law on the execution of financial penalties
 Investigating the performance of the country's officials and managers from a judicial and legal point of view
 Review and approval of plans and bills related to the law of organization and procedure of the Court of Administrative Justice
 Review and approval of legal and judicial plans and bills related to the country's economic system
 Reviewing and approving legal and judicial plans and bills related to the country's budget

Members 
The members of the Judiciary and Legal Commission of the Islamic Consultative Assembly in the first and second year of the 11th term of the Assembly are as follows:

See also 
 Program, Budget and Accounting Commission of the Islamic Consultative Assembly
 Education, Research and Technology Commission of the Islamic Consultative Assembly
 Social Commission of the Islamic Consultative Assembly
 Health and Medical Commission of the Islamic Consultative Assembly
 Internal Affairs of the Country and Councils Commission of the Islamic Consultative Assembly
 Industries and Mines Commission of the Islamic Consultative Assembly
 Agriculture, Water, Natural Resources and Environment Commission of the Islamic Consultative Assembly
 Cultural Commission of the Islamic Consultative Assembly
 The history of the parliament in Iran

References

Committees of the Iranian Parliament
Islamic Consultative Assembly